Bloor Passage is a passage leading northward from Meek Channel between Corner Island and Uruguay Island, in the Argentine Islands, Wilhelm Archipelago. It was named by the UK Antarctic Place-Names Committee in 1959 for Able Seaman Vincent T. Bloor, Royal Navy, a member of the British Naval Hydrographic Survey Unit in the area in 1957–58.

References
 

Straits of the Wilhelm Archipelago